Medianoche (Spanish for "midnight") is a type of sandwich which originated in Cuba. It is served in many Cuban communities in the United States. It is so named because of the sandwich's popularity as a staple served in Havana's night clubs right around or after midnight.

A medianoche consists of roast pork, ham, mustard, Swiss cheese, and sweet pickles. It is a close cousin to the Cuban sandwich, the chief difference being that a medianoche is made on soft, sweet egg dough bread similar to Challah rather than on crustier Cuban bread. Like the Cuban sandwich, the medianoche is typically warmed in a press before eating.

Elena Ruz
The Elena Ruz sandwich is a turkey sandwich with cream cheese and strawberry jam on toasted but not pressed medianoche bread. It is named after the Cuban socialite Elena Ruz Valdés-Fauli, who convinced the Havana restaurant El Carmelo to put it on the menu in the late 1920s or early 1930s. As of the 2020s, Cuban-American restaurants such as Versailles in Miami have continued to serve the sandwich despite waning popularity.

See also
List of sandwiches
Cuban cuisine
Muffuletta

References

Cheese sandwiches
Cuban cuisine
Pork sandwiches